Albert Alberts, writing as A. Alberts (1911–1995)  was a Dutch writer, translator, and journalist.  He won numerous awards throughout his career, among them the 1975 Constantijn Huygens Prize.

Life 
A. Alberts was born on 23 August 1911 in Haarlem.He studied Indology at the Utrecht University and worked after his graduation (1936) for several years as a civil servant for the Colonialministry in Paris.In 1939 he received his doctorate in literature and philosophy with a thesis about the conflict from 1847 to 1851 between Jean Chrétien Baud and Johan Rudolf Thorbecke, two Dutch politicians (respectively, a colonial governor turned Conservative parliamentarian and a major Liberal reformer). In the same year he embarked on MS Johan van Oldenbarnevelt and went to the Dutch East Indies to stay there as a civil servant.After the Battle of Java (1942) and his internment by the Japanese on Java from April 1942 to September 1945, he returned 1946 to the Netherlands. Here he worked first as a civil servant, then he starting 1953 as Contributing editor. In 1953 he published his first book, The Island- a collection of short stories about his Daily life in the colonies.Albert Alberts died in Amsterdam on 16 December 1995.

Works

Books 
 1938 Baud und Thorbecke 1847-1851
 1953 De eilanden (The island)
 1954 De bomen (The trees)
 1962 Namen noemen (Mention names)
 1963 De Franse slag (The French battle) or Aan Frankrijk uitgeleverd (Extradited to France)
 1963 Wilhelmina, Koningin der Nederlanden (Wilhelmina, Queen of Netherlands)
 1964 Koning Willem II
 1964 Koning Willem III
 1965 Johan Rudolf Thorbecke
 1967 Laten we vrede sluiten (Let's conclude peace)
 1968 Het einde van een verhouding (The end of relationship)
 1973 De huzaren van Castricum (see Jean Antoine de Collaert#Batavian Republic: 1795–1805)
 1973 Leven op de rand (Living on the border)
 1974 De vergaderzaal (The conference room)
 1975 De Hollanders komen ons vermoorden (The Hollanders are coming, to assassinate us)
 1976 Een koning die van geen née wil horen (A king who no wants to hear by no one)
 1976 Haast hebben in September (Hurry in the September)
 1978 De vergaderzaal (vierde druk)
 1979 De honden jagen niet meer (The dogs are hunting no more)
 1979 Per mailboot naar de Oost (By mail boat to the East)
 1981 Maar geel en glanzend blijft het goud  (But yellow and glossy remains the gold)
 1982 Het zand voor de kust van Aveiro (The sand for the coast of Aveiro)
 1983 De Utrechtse herinneringen van A. Alberts (A. Alberts Utrecht memories)
 1984 De zilveren kogel
 1986 Inleiding tot de kennis van de ambtenaar (Introduction to the knowledge of the civil servants)
 1987 Een venster op het Buitenhof
 1989 Een kolonie is ook maar een mens (A colony is also only a person)
 1990 Op weg naar het zoveelste Reich (On the way to the nth  Reich)
 1991 De vrouw met de parasol (The woman with the sunshade)
 1992 Libretto voor een gewezen koningin (Libretto for a former queen)
 1992 Twee jaargetijden minder (Two seasons less)

Films 
 1977 De vergaderzaal (The conference room)  director: Kees van Iersel
 2008 The Swamp (based on A. Alberts story Het moeras)  director: BarBara Hanlo

Honors 
 1953 Prosa-Award from Amsterdam
 1973 Marianne Philips Prize
 1975 Constantijn-Huygens-Preis
 1994 Silver Medal of the  Utrecht University
 1995 P.C. Hooft-prijs

References

External links 
Profile at the Digital library for Dutch literature

1911 births
1995 deaths
20th-century Dutch novelists
20th-century Dutch male writers
Dutch translators
Writers from Haarlem
Constantijn Huygens Prize winners
P. C. Hooft Award winners
20th-century translators
Dutch male novelists
20th-century Dutch journalists